Oussouye Department is one of the departments of Senegal, located in the Ziguinchor Region. It's situated in Basse Casamance, on the right bank of the mouth of the Casamance River.

Administration
Oussouye is its main village, which is also the only commune of the department.

It is divided in two arrondissements made up of rural districts (communautés rurales):
 Cabrousse Arrondissement
 Diembéring
 Santhiaba Manjacque
 Loudia Ouolof Arrondissement
 Mlomp
 Oukout

Historic sites  

 Karabane, historic centre, Loudia Arrondissement 
 Residence of the Prefect at Oussouye
 100-year-old fromager (kapok) trees of Kagnout
 Wells of El Hadj Umar Tall at Elinkine, Loudia Arrondissement. (Water was found where he threw his rosary, according to legend)
 multistorey houses at Mlomp

Economy
The most important economic activities are farming, specially rice farming in the mangrove zone, tourism and fishing. Oussouye is one of the biggest touristic centers in Senegal, with seaside resorts like Cap-skirring and Djimbéring. Fishing is also an important source of revenue thanks to the existence of the mangrove ecosystem.

References

 
Departments of Senegal
Ziguinchor Region